The Drifting Cowboys were the backing group for American country legend and singer-songwriter Hank Williams. The band went through several lineups during Williams' career. The original lineup was formed in 1937, changing musicians from show to show until Williams signed with Sterling Records.

The lineup was further modified in the following years, with the most famous version of the group formed in 1949 for Williams' appearance on the Grand Ole Opry. Although the Drifting Cowboys were credited on Williams' records, until 1950, Williams was backed by session musicians on recordings, with the label crediting the Cowboys. In 1951, Williams disbanded the group. After his death, the band was used for a short time by Ray Price. Former members later toured under the name of the band.

History

Hank Williams formed the original Drifting Cowboys band between 1937 and 1938 in Montgomery, Alabama. The name was derived from Williams' love of Western films, with him and the band wearing cowboy hats and boots. The original line-up consisted of Braxton Schuffert (guitar), Freddie Beach (fiddle), and the comedian Smith "Hezzy" Adair. The youngest member of the band was thirteen-year-old steel guitar player James E. Porter. During the 1930s, the Drifting Cowboys varied from one show to another, with members playing a few shows before leaving and being replaced. In 1944, Don Helms joined the band playing the steel guitar, and Sammy Pruett on guitar, however both left the band after a year.

When Williams signed with Sterling Records, he formed a new band: R.D Norred (steel guitar), Joe Pennington (guitar), Herbert "Lum" York (bass) and Winston Todd (guitar). Hank and Audrey Williams requested a loan to buy the band matching outfits that they wore on performances. The band was renewed by Williams for his first appearance on the Louisiana Hayride in 1948, with Bob McNett (guitar), "Lum" York (bass), Tony Francini (fiddle), Felton Pruett (steel guitar) and Dent Holmes (guitar).

For his June 1949 debut at the Grand Ole Opry, Williams formed the most famous version of the Drifting Cowboys: Bob McNett (guitar), Hillous Butrum (bass), Jerry Rivers (fiddle) and Don Helms (steel guitar). Until 1950, Williams' songs were recorded with session musicians, with the label crediting the backing to the Drifting Cowboys Band. In 1950, McNett and Butrum left the band, being replaced by Sammy Pruett and Cedric Rainwater. In 1951, before undergoing back surgery and not knowing how long he would be unable to tour, Williams disbanded the group. During 1952, he was not backed by the Drifting Cowboys. After his death, the band was used for a short time by Ray Price. Band members would later tour as the Drifting Cowboys for several years.

Members

Original lineup
Braxton Schuffert – guitar
Freddie Beach – fiddle
Smith "Hezzy" Adair – bass, harmonica 
James E. Porter – steel guitar

Main members
Don Helms – steel guitar 
Jerry Rivers  – Fiddle  
Bob McNett and Sammy Pruett – Guitar
Hillous Butrum, Cedric Rainwater, Herbert "Lum" York – bass

Other members
Felton Pruett

Clent Holmes
Joe Pennington
Lemuel Curtiss Crysel
Joseph L."Buddy" Jolly
Grady Martin
Billy Byrd
Jack Drake
Daniel Jack Boling
George Brown
Louis Brown
High Sheriff
Lefty Clark
Walter Rex Compton 1923–1980
Curly Corbin
Clyde Criswell
Zeke Crittenden
Little Joe Stanley
Richard Paul Dennis Jr
Allen Dunkin
Willie Harper
James Porter
Clarence Able
 Mitt Ike DeRamus
 Ernie lee Roberts
 Woody Jones
 Eugene Rollan
 Gerald Boger

References

External links
Most total information

American country music groups
Hank Williams
Musical backing groups